Ooperipatellus decoratus is a species of velvet worm in the family Peripatopsidae. This species has 14 pairs of legs and is found in Tasmania, Australia.

References

Further reading

Onychophorans of Australasia
Onychophoran species
Animals described in 1977